The Scottish Renaissance humanist George Buchanan gave a long list of Scottish Kings in his history of Scotland—published in Latin as Rerum Scoticarum Historia in 1582—most of whom are now considered by historians to be figures of legend, or completely misrepresented. The list went back around 1900 years from his time, and began with Fergus I. James VI of Scotland, who was Buchanan's pupil, adopted the story of Fergus I as his ancestor, and the antiquity of the line was emphasised by the House of Stuart.

Dynastic importance
The genealogy of Scottish kings, going back to Fergus mac Ferchar (i.e. Fergus I) and beyond, was in place by the middle of the 13th century when it was recited at the 1249 inauguration of Alexander III of Scotland. In 1301 Baldred Bisset was involved in a hearing at the Papal Curia, on the Scottish side of the debate on Edward I of England's claims, and at least helped prepare material dealing with the mythological history that was being adduced as relevant, on both sides.

The question of the antiquity of the Scottish royal lineage, and even the details of the associated origin myth, became particularly significant from 1542 when Mary, Queen of Scots came to the Scottish throne. Buchanan alluded to Mary's long ancestry in his Epithalamium written for her 1559 marriage to Francis II of France. In the period before Mary's betrothal, a marriage to Prince Edward, the future Edward VI of England, was much discussed. As part of that debate, the list of legendary kings of Britain became involved, in the form of the "Brutus myth", promoted by Edward Hall over the doubts of Polydore Vergil. Publicists on the English side of the argument, including John Elder, James Henrisoun, and William Lamb, had cast doubt on Scottish history.

When James VI entered Edinburgh in 1579 the pageantry included a public posting of the genealogy of the Scottish kings; and when his son Charles I visited in 1633, portraits of 
107 kings were displayed, some of which (by George Jamesone) survive. Another series of 110 imagined portraits of the monarchs from the list was painted for Charles II by Jacob de Wet II, and hung in Holyrood Palace. The de Wet portrait collection later became a noted sight for tourists, for example as written about by John Macky, A Journey through Scotland.

Historiography of Buchanan's list
While Rerum Scoticarum Historia was published only in the year of Buchanan's death, he had worked on it during much of his life. It was published with his De jure regni apud Scotos, first printed in 1579. Of the two works, the Historia for Buchanan served as a source of precedents on dealing with bad kings (tyrants in the list inevitably come to a sorry end at the hands of the people, in line with Buchanan's monarchomach position), while the De jure is cast as a humanist dialogue between Buchanan himself and Thomas Maitland, and concentrates on classical exemplars. Both works were dedicated to James VI. King James came to regard the chronicles of Buchanan and John Knox as "infamous invectives".

The king-list of the Historia was, therefore, in that work, only incidental to Buchanan's purpose in the book, whatever later uses it may have been put to. After the later scholarly work of Thomas Innes, this list was given little credence in its initial parts. It was, however, the culmination of centuries of development of king-lists for the Kingdom of Scotland. Much fictional material had been introduced into these lists by the humanist Hector Boece, writing half a century before Buchanan. Peter Hume Brown in his biography of Buchanan describes him as somewhat more sceptical than Boece in what he accepted as historical; but less so than John Mair, writing earlier. Buchanan has been called inconsistent in his treatment of classical sources since his rejection of the legend of Gathelus does not extend to the early Scottish kings, who are equally unsupported by classical authors.

Writers who perpetuated the Boece tradition, as put into form by Buchanan, included:

Alexander Gardyne, Theatre of the Scotish Kings, published 1709 by James Watson
David Hume of Godscroft
Gilbert Gray
James Ussher
James Wallace,  The History of the Kingdom of Scotland from Fergus the First King to the Union (1724)
John Johnston, Inscriptiones Historicæ Regum Scotorum, continuata annorum serie a Fergusio I. ad Jacobum VI. (1602)

The antiquity of the line was attacked by William Lloyd, who argued that Scotland was not settled before the 6th century; George Mackenzie published the 1685 Defence of the Antiquity of the Royal Line of Scotland against Lloyd, and a sequel the next year against Edward Stillingfleet, who had given a sceptical account of Boece's history in Chapter V of his Origines Britannicae. The work of Innes, which in effect terminated the scholarly debate, was published in 1729, but the tradition continued.

Francis Nichols, The British Compendium (1741)
James Anderson, Royal Genealogies (1732). This book was based on a work of Johann Hübner, but with Anderson's additions. The king-list is Table 499, attributed to Boece and Buchanan.
William Guthrie.

Subsequently, John Pinkerton and William Forbes Skene contributed to the study of the king-lists. Reference works continued, however, to copy Buchanan's list, and the mythological history took many years to drop out of circulation, persisting in print as factual well into the 19th century (for example the fourth edition of the Encyclopædia Britannica (1810), the Encyclopædia Perthensis (1816), the London Encyclopedia (1829), and the individual kings in reference books by George Crabb and John Platts).

Legendary content
See list of Scottish monarchs for the view of contemporary historians of Scotland. The first historical figure in Buchanan's list is Caratacus. The rediscovery of the works of Tacitus prompted Boece to include this well-attested figure from the period of the Roman occupation of Britain.

The last legendary figure is more complex to discuss. The kings in the list from about the 6th century (in the Fifth Book of Buchanan) onwards may have some relationship to historical figures in the Kingdom of Dalriada, extending in present-day terms from western Scotland to part of Ireland. See list of Kings of Dál Riata. But the Kingdom of Scotland (i.e. Alba) was not a historical reality until Kenneth MacAlpin created it in the year 843, and what was said about his predecessors in the list by Buchanan may have little historical foundation.

The list of Kings of the Picts includes other historical figures reigning in parallel with the Dalriada kings, in other areas of what is now Scotland. The critical Essay (1729) of Innes, while demolishing the king-list going back to Boece, substituted in part kings of the Picts, and is now regarded as questionable in its own way. Innes was a Jacobite and concerned therefore to lay emphasis on legitimacy of descent and primogeniture.

Legendary kings (Buchanan), BC

Legendary kings (Buchanan), Caratacus to Eugenius I

Buchanan's Fifth Book, Fergus II to Kenneth II

Sixth Book, later kings
(73) Grig/Gregory the Great: see Giric

Notes

External links
1831 English translation of Buchanan
Boece, Scotorum Historia (1575 edition)
Chart
Holinshed, A History of Scotland
Link to another translation of Buchanan
Links to Buchanan's Latin
Metrical version of Boece, by William Stewart, edited by William Barclay Turnbull (1858)

Attribution

Scotland
Kings